Loehle may refer to:
Loehle Aircraft, an American aircraft manufacturing company
The following aircraft produced by the company:
Loehle 5151 Mustang, a replica of the P-51 Mustang
Loehle Sport Parasol, an American single-engine ultralight aircraft
Loehle Spad XIII, a line of single-engine ultralight aircraft

People
Alan Loehle (born 1954), American painter and professor at Oglethorpe University